Governor Gregory may refer to:

John Munford Gregory (1804–1884), Acting Governor of Virginia from 1842 to 1843
William Gregory (Rhode Island governor) (1849–1901), 46th Governor of Rhode Island
William Henry Gregory (1817–1892), 14th Governor of British Ceylon

See also
Christine Gregoire (born 1947), 22nd Governor of Washington
Gobernador Gregores, Santa Cruz, Argentina
Gobernador Gregores Airport